The Alfa Romeo GT (Type 937) is a coupe automobile that was produced by the Italian automaker Alfa Romeo between 2003 and 2010. The GT was introduced in March 2003 at the Geneva Motor Show. Production commenced on 28 November 2003, the GT was built at the Pomigliano plant, alongside the 147 and 159. A total of 80,832 units were produced.

History 
The GT was based on Fiat C-platform (also used for the 156) with styling by Bertone. Initially, Bertone insisted to assemble the car at their own plant but after refusal from Alfa Romeo's parent company Fiat, the GT was assembled at the Pomigliano plant instead.

The bodywork is in a classic coupé style, but uses a hatchback two door style compared to the earlier coupés like GTV and some rivals such as the BMW 3 Series Coupé. Combined with a full rear bench giving five seats (rather than a 2+2 layout) the GT was advertised as being a practical sports car. Most mechanicals were taken directly from the 156/147 using the same double wishbone front suspension and independent rear using MacPherson struts, parallel arms, and reaction rods with a small amount of passive rear steering.

The interior is derived from the smaller 147 hatchback and shares many common parts: such as having the same dash layout, functions, the climate control system as well as having a similar electrical system. 

Some exterior parts are also shared with the 147 such as the bonnet, wing mirrors, and front wings (from the 147 GTA). The engine range included both the 1.8 TS and the 2.0 JTS petrol engines, a 1.9 MultiJet turbodiesel, and a top of the range 3.2 V6 petrol engine.

The GT was positioned as a sports car in Alfa Romeo's range, along with the Brera (which was based on the newer mid-size Alfa 159). In October 2006, Alfa Romeo introduced a 1.9 JTD Q2 version with a limited-slip differential, and also added a new trim level called Black Line.

In 2008, the cloverleaf model was launched as a limited edition complete with new trim levels, lowered suspension, body kit, 18 inch alloy wheels and was only available in Black, Alfa Red, or Blue colours. The engines included the 1.8 L and 2.0 L petrol, as well as 1.9 L Multijet turbo diesel. Production of the cloverleaf ended on 16 June 2010.

Specifications 

Standard features included power steering, a trip computer, air conditioning, dual climate control, airbags (including 'curtain' airbags) with internal passenger sensors to decide remotely which airbags to deploy, side mirror defrosters, and cruise control, plus options like reverse assist, seat warmers, leather interior, ten CD changer, satellite radio controls and windscreen sensors for automatic wiper activation.

Engines 
The GT primarily shared its engines with the 156.

Petrol
 1.8L inline four, 16 valve Twin Spark
 2.0L inline four, 16 valve JTS petrol with direct injection
 3.2L V6, 24 valve 'Busso' 
 Diesel

References:

Brakes and suspension 
The 3.2 V6 model has  ventilated discs at front. The GT included anti-lock braking system with electronic brakeforce distribution and hydraulic brake assistance.

Other features included VDC (Vehicle Dynamic Control) or Alfa's version of ESP (Electronic Stability Program), ASR (Anti Slip Regulation) or traction control, EBD (Electronic Brake Distribution), ABS, brake assist and later the Q2 System. The Q2 system is Alfa's limited-slip differential technology, for improved cornering, reducing wheel spin, and torque steer, to help mitigate understeer common to front-wheel-drive cars.

Fuel consumption 

References:

References:

Special Models 
At the end of its production, several special models of the GT were launched for sale in different markets which included the following.

The Special Edition (British Market) 
The Special Edition 1.9 JTDm was produced for the British market, where it had to be preordered by the customer. Its unofficial name was "quadrifoglio verde" (cloverleaf). It had leather interior and Q2 system as standard.

The Run Out Edition (Sport) (Dutch Market) 

The Run Out Edition 2.0 JTS (black only) was assembled in a run of 12 cars for the Dutch dealers only. This version had some specifications improved in respect to the creature comforts; the Bose audio system was connected to a multimedia USB and was integrated to the Bluetooth blue&me system. 

The Run Out Edition has eighteen-inch alloy wheels, painted brake calipers, black instruments with white backlighting, a black leather steering wheel, and alloy pedals. Furthermore, the car is fitted with specific sized grey leather seats and interior.

The Centenario (Australian, South African and French Markets) 
The "100th anniversary limited edition" version  is intended for the Australian and South African markets;, and coloured Rosso Alfa, Atlantic Blue, Black and Ice White. The "100th Anniversary Limited Edition" was produced in a limited run of 130 units: 100 for the Australian market and 30 for the South African market.

Following an overhauling of the range in that market, GTs were equipped with the 3.2 V6 with the manual six speed gearbox. A "Centenario" version was made for the French market. It had a rear view camera, Blue & Me and the 1.9 JTDm 16V engine.

The Quadrifoglio Oro (Japanese Market) 
The Quadrifoglio Oro was a special model for the Japanese market and was limited to 60 units with specifications similar to the Dutch Run Out: 2.0 JTS engine, Selespeed gearbox, red instruments, alloy wheels, red paint. This was the last model of the GT to be made.

GT Cabriolet Concept 

A soft-top GT Cabrio Concept was designed and developed by Bertone in 2003, it was unveiled to the public on April 6, 2011. The car was a four-seat open-top version of the GT coupé, which Bertone hoped to get built at their own plant. The next-generation Alfa Romeo open-top car was instead built by Pininfarina, using the Brera coupé as a base. This move ultimately led to the bankruptcy of Bertone and it was bought by Fiat who restructured it into its operations.

Reception 
The GT has been acclaimed for its attractive styling and purposeful good looks. The design by Bertone follows a history of collaboration with Alfa Romeo.

In 2004, the Alfa Romeo GT was voted the world's most beautiful coupe in the annual 'World's Most Beautiful Automobile' (L'Automobile più Bella del Mondo) awards.

References

External links 

 Alfa Romeo GT Review - TimesOnline.co.uk

GT
Bertone vehicles
Front-wheel-drive sports cars
Coupés
2010s cars
Cars introduced in 2003